Lazar Cvetković (born 13 October 1995) is a Serbian football midfielder who plays for Tabane Trgovački, on loan from Jagodina.

Career

Jagodina
Cvetković was loaned to OFK Tabane for the second half of 2013–14. He made 11 league appearances and scored 1 goal until the end of season. Cvetković also played for Tabane in the 2014–15 season. After Jagodina's decision to rejuvenate the team, Cvetković returned from loan. He made his professional debut for Jagodina in 2nd fixture of 2015–16 Serbian SuperLiga, against Partizan. Next, he was loaned to Tabane again.

Career statistics

References

External links
 
 Lazar Cvetković stats at utakmica.rs

1995 births
Living people
Sportspeople from Jagodina
Association football midfielders
Serbian footballers
FK Jagodina players
Serbian SuperLiga players